Imperious may refer to:

 Arrogant or haughty superiority to or disdain of those one views as unworthy
 Various social interactions and relationships involving Dominance
 Imperious - a fictional character in the Power Rangers franchise

See also
Imperialism - a strategy for building an empire
Imperious Delirium, a 2008 album by Australian rock music group The Saints
Superiority complex - a psychological condition
Hubris - a personality trait